Satguru Chellapaswami (Tamil: செல்லப்பாசுவாமி, 1840–1915) was a 20th-century Sri Lankan Shaiva Hindu Sage. He was guru of famous Satguru Yogaswami and was 160th Jagadacharya of the Nandinatha Sampradaya's Kailasa Parampara. He lived in the Jaffna peninsula near Nallur Kandaswamy temple His guru was Kadaitswami.

Spiritual lineage 
He followed shaivism sect (Shaiva Siddhanta) of Hinduism. He belongs to  Nandinatha Sampradaya's Kailasa Parampara. Saiva siddhanta is prevalent in South India, Sri Lanka and Malaysia.

His Spiritual lineage : Maharishi Nandinath→ Tirumular→ → → nameless rishi from himalayas →Kadaitswami→  Chellappaswami→ Yogaswami→Sivaya Subramuniyaswami→ Bodhinatha Veylanswami

References

1840 births
1915 deaths
Shaivite religious leaders